David Denman (born July 25, 1973) is an American actor. He made his film debut in The Replacements. His other feature credits include Big Fish, Fair Game, The Nines, Shutter, Smart People, Fanboys, Let Go, Out Cold, After Earth, Jobs, Beneath the Harvest Sky, Men, Women & Children, The Gift, 13 Hours, Power Rangers, Logan Lucky, Puzzle and Brightburn.

On television, Denman is most widely known for the role of Roy Anderson, the ex-fiancé of Pam Beesly on the NBC sitcom The Office, for which he earned a SAG award as a member of the ensemble cast. He also starred as Frank Sheehan in the HBO limited series drama Mare of Easttown.

Early life
Denman was born in Newport Beach, California. He attended eight different schools while growing up all over Southern California. His family moved to Sequim, Washington, when he was 9 to live on a farm, which lasted two years before they returned to Orange County, California. He graduated from Fountain Valley High School, where classmates included actor Omar Metwally and writer-director Craig Brewer. He later attended the summer training congress at American Conservatory Theater in San Francisco, California. He spent two years at Orange Coast College, where he performed in and directed over twenty productions. He went on to earn a Bachelor of Fine Arts degree from the Juilliard School's Drama Division (1993-1997, Group 26), where his classmates included Sara Ramirez and Alan Tudyk.

Career
Denman made his film debut with Keanu Reeves and Gene Hackman as the deaf tight-end in the Warner Bros. football comedy The Replacements. His other feature credits include Fair Game, Fanboys, The Nines, Shutter, Smart People, Let Go, Out Cold, and Big Fish. His 2013 films include After Earth, Jobs, and Blue Potato. In 2016, Denman starred in the Michael Bay film 13 Hours about the 2012 Benghazi attack.

In addition to The Office, Denman's other television roles include Mike Reilly on the critically acclaimed and short-lived Fox comedy Traffic Light and in Robert Kirkman's short lived horror series Outcast. He has recurred as Ed Brooks on Parenthood, as Tony on Drop Dead Diva and as Skip the Demon on Angel. He has appeared on such TV shows as ER, The X-Files, Mad Men and True Detective.

Personal life
Denman was married to Nikki Boyer from 2001 to 2010. In September 2014, Denman married actress and former model Mercedes Mason. The couple had their first child, Caius, in January 2018 and their second child, Sagan, in May 2021.

Denman is also an avid triathlete.

Filmography

Film

Television

References

External links

 

1973 births
20th-century American male actors
21st-century American male actors
American male film actors
American male television actors
Juilliard School alumni
Living people
Orange Coast College alumni
Male actors from Newport Beach, California
People from Greater Los Angeles